Myat Hpone Pyo (also spelled မြတ်ဖုန်းဖြိုး) was the chief wife of Gov. Thado Minsaw of Tharrawaddy. She was the mother of King Bayin Htwe of Prome (r. 1526–1532), and paternal grandmother of kings Narapati of Prome (r. 1532–1539) and Minkhaung of Prome (r. 1539–1542).

Brief
Myat Hpone Pyo (or Myat Hpone Hpyo) was the youngest child of Princess Saw Min Phyu and Saw Shwe Khet, who was governor of Prome  (r. 1417–1422; 1442–1446) and Tharrawaddy (r. 1422–1427; 1446–1460). The princess was a granddaughter of the famous crown prince Minye Kyawswa of Ava, and a great granddaughter of King Minkhaung I of Ava from her mother's side, and a descendant of King Kyawswa of Pagan from both sides. She had two full siblings: Gov. Minye Kyawswa I of Kalay and Saw Myat Lay; and three half-siblings.

Though the royal chronicles do not state her place of birth, Myat Hpone Pyo was most probably born and raised in Prome where her father was governor between 1442 and 1446, and raised in Tharrawaddy, the southernmost district of Prome to which her father was reassigned, from 1446 onwards to  1460. The princess remained in Tharrawaddy as she was married off to the incoming governor, Thado Minsaw, the youngest son of then King Narapati I of Ava. She had six children with Thado Minsaw, and died in Tharrawaddy.

Family
Myat Hpone Pyo and Thado Minsaw had three sons and three daughters, according to the chronicle Yazawin Thit.

 Mi Hpone-Gyi, wife of Minye Theingathu of Kandwin, son of Mingyi Swa
 Minye Nawrahta, Gov. of Tharrawaddy (r. 1525–1531), in revolt (1531 onwards), married to his first cousin Min Hla Myat, daughter of Mingyi Swa
 Mibaya Khaung Medaw, wife of Minye Theingathu of Kandwin
 Bodaw Hnamadaw, wife of Mingyi Khame
 Bayin Htwe, King of Prome (r. 1526–1532)
 unnamed son

Ancestry
The following is the princess's ancestry according to the royal chronicles.

Notes

References

Bibliography
 
 
 

Ava dynasty